USIS may refer to:

 USIS (company), a U.S. government contractor
 United States Information Service, another name for the United States Information Agency
 United States Immigration Service, a name sometimes used in the past, possibly both formally and informally at different times, to refer to at least one of the many U.S. federal agencies of the executive branch which have implemented U.S. immigration law. (Today the principal such agency is the U.S. Immigration and Customs Enforcement.)
 Universal Space Interface Standard, an industry standard for docking of spacecraft.